Halabja Governorate is a governorate in the autonomous region of Kurdistan Region in Iraq. The governorate was established in 2014, splitting off from Sulaymaniyah Governorate and becoming the fourth governorate in the Kurdistan Region of Iraq. Its capital is the city of Halabja. Halabja Governorate is the least populated Iraqi Governorate.

History
The Kurdish Parliament first agreed to turn Halabja District into a province in 1999, but it was not enacted at the time. The Kurdistan Region approved of it becoming a governorate in June 2013. Iraq's Council of Ministers approved a bill on 31 December 2013 to enable it. The Iraqi Parliament had to pass the bill but failed to do so. However, the Speaker of the house, Osama Nujaifi, advised that Kurdistan had the power to make Halabja a province. On 13 March 2014, Nechirvan Barzani, Prime Minister of Kurdistan, signed the decision of making Halabja district the fourth governorate of Kurdistan Region; that happened just three days before the remembrance of Halabja chemical attack, which happened on 16 March 1988. On March 16, 2014, Kurdistan Region President Masoud Barzani signed a regional directive to promote Halabja from district status to a province. The Kurdish Parliament passed a bill in February 2015 to establish the legal framework for selecting a provincial council and a governor. As of December 2015, the Iraqi Parliament had not yet officially recognised the province, apparently because of issues with budgeting finance for it. In August 2018, the then Iraqi Interior Minister, Qasim al-Araji, approved authorization for the opening of federal offices that would issue passports, national ID cards, and other civil documents under its own name. On the 13th of March 2023, The Iraqi council of ministers recognised Halabja as an official governorate of Iraq.

Districts
Halabja comprises the central district, Halabja, and three other districts, Sirwan, Khurmal, Byara (Bayyarah) and Bamo. Three other districts of the Sulaymaniyah Governorate had the option of joining the province, but decided against it.

References

 
Governorates of Iraq
Geography of Iraqi Kurdistan
States and territories established in 2014
2014 establishments in Iraqi Kurdistan